An amino acid transporter is a membrane transport protein that transports amino acids. They are mainly of the solute carrier family.

Families 
There are several families that function in amino acid transport, some of these include:
 TC# 2.A.3 - Amino Acid-Polyamine-Organocation (APC) Superfamily
 TC# 2.A.18 - Amino Acid/Auxin Permease (AAAP) Family
 TC# 2.A.23 - Dicarboxylate/Amino Acid:Cation (Na+ or H+) Symporter (DAACS) Family
 TC# 2.A.26 - Branched Chain Amino Acid:Cation Symporter (LIVCS) Family
 TC# 2.A.42 - Hydroxy/Aromatic Amino Acid Permease (HAAAP) Family
 TC# 2.A.78 - Branched Chain Amino Acid Exporter (LIV-E) Family
 TC# 2.A.95 - 6TMS Neutral Amino Acid Transporter (NAAT) Family
 TC# 2.A.118 - Basic Amino Acid Antiporter (ArcD) Family
 TC# 2.A.120 - Putative Amino Acid Permease (PAAP) Family

Solute carrier family examples
 (1) high affinity glutamate and neutral amino acid transporter
 (3) heavy subunits of heteromeric amino acid transporters
 (6) Bacterial Leucine Transporter (LeuT)
 (7) cationic amino acid transporter/glycoprotein-associated
 (15) proton oligopeptide cotransporter
 (17) vesicular glutamate transporter
 (18) vesicular amine transporter
 (25) some mitochondrial carriers
 (26) multifunctional anion exchanger
 (32) vesicular inhibitory amino acid transporter
 (36) proton-coupled amino acid transporter
 (38) System A & N, sodium-coupled neutral amino acid transporter

VIAAT 
Vesicular inhibitory amino acid transporter (VIAAT) is responsible for the storage of GABA and glycine in neuronal synaptic vesicles.

Human proteins containing this domain 
SLC32A1; SLC36A1; SLC36A2; SLC36A3; SLC36A4; SLC38A1; SLC38A2; SLC38A3; SLC38A4; SLC38A5; SLC38A6.

See also 
 Solute carrier family
 Amino acid transport
 Amino acid transport, acidic
 Amino acid transport, basic
 Amino acid transport disorder
 Amino acid
 Transporter Classification Database

References

Solute carrier family